Maria Kimberly (born July 21, 1944, as Mary Ann Kimmerle, 1943 or 1944) is a former American top model and actress.

Biography
She grew up in Terre Haute, Indiana, and, then, Columbus, Ohio. She was a top model in the late sixties and early seventies. In the seventies, she was the girlfriend for many years of Paris billionaire art gallerist Alec Wildenstein who left her when he met his future wife Jocelyne Périsset. Though they were never married, Alec Wildenstein ended up reaching a financial settlement with Kimberly. In 1982 she married real estate mogul and lawyer Jay Landesman and lived as Mary Ann Kimmerle Landesman in New York City.

Her involvement in the French artistic milieu allowed her to get the lead female role of Jacques Tati's penultimate film Trafic, where she played Maria, the press attaché of Altra. Tati having been ruined by the failure of Playtime, the film was made possible by financial support of Alec Wildenstein, who, in return, had Kimberley cast in the lead female role, his companion at the time.

References

External links
 
 

Female models from Indiana
American film actresses
Living people
Actors from Terre Haute, Indiana
1940s births
21st-century American women